The Saguenay City Council (in French: Conseil municipal de la Ville de Saguenay) is the governing body for the mayor–council government in the city of Saguenay, in the Saguenay–Lac-Saint-Jean region of Quebec.

Mayor
Jean Tremblay, Independent (2002–2017)
Josée Néron, Équipe du renouveau démocratique (2017–2021)
Julie Dufour, Independent (2021–present)

Councillors
As of the 2021 Quebec municipal elections

Jonquière Borough
District 1:  Jimmy Bouchard, Independent 

District 2:  Claude Bouchard, Independent  

District 3:  Michel Thiffault, Independent

District 4:  Kevin Armstrong, Independent

District 5:  Carl Dufour, Independent - borough president

District 6:  Jean-Marc Crevier, Independent

Chicoutimi Borough
District 7:  Serge Gaudreault, Independent

District 8:  Mireille Jean, Independent

District 9:  Michel Tremblay, Independent 

District 10: Jacques Cleary, Independent - borough president

District 11: Marc Bouchard,  Équipe du Renouveau Démocratique 
 
District 12: Michel Potvin, Independent

La Baie Borough
District 13: Raynald Simard, Independent - borough president

District 14: Jean Tremblay, Independent (elected in 2022 by-election); previously Éric Simard, Independent  

District 15: Martin Harvey, Independent

External links
Saguenay City Council page 
Official Saguenay municipal site

References

Municipal councils in Quebec
Politics of Saguenay, Quebec